The Enduro Cup (formally known as the Pirtek Enduro Cup for sponsorship reasons), was an award given out to the highest points scorers over the three endurance events in Supercars; the Sandown 500, Bathurst 1000 and the Gold Coast 600.

Format

Qualifying for the Sandown 500 involved a twenty-minute session followed by a pair of 60 km "qualifying races" held on Saturday. The grid for the first race was based on the qualifying session; the grid for the second race was based on the results of the first. The results of the second race determined the grid for the main race on Sunday. Co-drivers were mandated to compete in the first of the qualifying races with the main driver in the second. The Bathurst 1000 featured a single forty-minute qualifying session on Friday afternoon followed by a top ten shootout on Saturday. The Gold Coast 600 had two thirty-minute qualifying sessions, one each on Saturday and Sunday, with the Saturday session followed by a top ten shootout. The Sandown 500 and Bathurst 1000 both had a twenty-minute warm-up session on Sunday morning.

The Sandown 500 and the Bathurst 1000 featured single races held on Sunday, at 500 km and 1000 km in length respectively. The Gold Coast 600 consisted of two 300 km races with one held on Saturday and one on Sunday. For each of these races, each driver in every car was mandated to drive at least one third of the total race distance.

Background

From 1981 to 1986 and in 1990 and 1991, the Australian Endurance Championship was held for touring cars over several races per year, however unlike today was not a part of that year's Australian Touring Car Championship. As per the Enduro Cup, the Sandown 500 and Bathurst 1000 regularly featured as championship rounds, and some years also had an event on the Gold Coast, at Surfers Paradise International Raceway. Allan Moffat and Jim Richards were the only two-time championship winners in this era.

The Pirtek Enduro Cup was launched in 2013 as a way to link together the series' three two-driver endurance events. These races are Australia's traditional two endurance races, the Sandown 500 and Bathurst 1000, and the Gold Coast 600, which switched to a two-driver, two-race endurance format in 2010. From 2010 to 2012, the Gold Coast 600 required teams to use an international driver to accompany the local series regulars. In 2013, this requirement was dropped and teams could now pick the same driver for all three events. To accompany this, the Enduro Cup was introduced, as a championship within a championship. The award is sponsored by Pirtek, who had previously sponsored the successful Stone Brothers Racing as a title sponsor from 1998 to 2005. A collection of Pirtek hose fittings were used to create the trophy awarded to the winners.

History

In 2013, Craig Lowndes and Warren Luff won the Enduro Cup, despite winning only the first race of the Gold Coast 600. In 2014, Jamie Whincup and Paul Dumbrell won the Enduro Cup, again for Triple Eight Race Engineering, winning both the Sandown 500 and the second race on the Gold Coast in the process. In 2015, Luff became the first driver to win the Enduro Cup on more than one occasion, this time driving with Garth Tander for the Holden Racing Team. Tander and Luff did not win any of the four races in the endurance season, with consistent results of two third and two fourth places instead accumulating enough points to win the trophy. In 2016, the all-international pairing of Shane van Gisbergen and Alexandre Prémat won the trophy, with three second-place finishes and one win amounting to the most dominant performance in the Enduro Cup era. In 2017, Chaz Mostert and Steve Owen won the first Enduro Cup for Ford, with one win at the Gold Coast 600. 

The 2018 winners were Craig Lowndes, who joined his 2013 co-driver Luff as a two-time winner, and Steven Richards driving a Holden Commodore ZB for Triple Eight Race Engineering. Lowndes and Richards became the first winners of the Enduro Cup to have also won the Bathurst 1000 in the same year, while in the second Gold Coast 600 race they were under investigation for two separate infringements, prior to the race being abandoned due to bad weather. Lowndes retired from full-time Supercars competition after 2018, but went on to win the Enduro Cup again in 2019 as co-driver to Jamie Whincup. The 2019 series also featured the first shift in the endurance calendar since the cup's inception with the Sandown 500 moving from the first to the last of the three endurance events. The qualifying races at Sandown also became points-paying races, contributing to the Enduro Cup results.

Demise

The Sandown 500 was scheduled to drop out of the Enduro Cup in 2020, to be replaced by The Bend 500 at The Bend Motorsport Park. In a reshuffled calendar due to the COVID-19 pandemic, both the Gold Coast 600 and The Bend 500 were cancelled and the 2020 Bathurst 1000 was the only endurance event held. No Enduro Cup was awarded for this single event, and the 2021 Supercars Championship was again scheduled to contain only one endurance event, without an Enduro Cup.

Points system
Points were awarded as follows at the Enduro Cup events. Each of the three events were worth 300 points in total, with both drivers earning the total points awarded to the finishing position of the car. As the Gold Coast 600 was a two-race event, the 300 points was divided across each race with the winners taking 150 points.

Winners

Multiple winners

By driver

By team

By manufacturer

References

Auto racing trophies and awards
Supercars Championship